Van Till is a surname. Notable people with the surname include:

Howard J. Van Till (born 1938), American physicist and academic

Surnames of Dutch origin